Dr Eusebio Rodolfo Cordón Cea (December 16, 1899 – January 9, 1966) was provisional president of El Salvador between January 25 and July 1, 1962.

He served as the President of the Legislative Assembly of El Salvador in 1962.

References 

1899 births
1966 deaths
People from Sonsonate Department
Salvadoran people of Spanish descent
Presidents of El Salvador
Presidents of the Legislative Assembly of El Salvador
20th-century Salvadoran politicians